Alambadi may refer to:
 Alambadi (cattle), a breed of cattle
 Alambadi (politician), Indian politician
 Alambadi, Cuddalore, a village panchayat in Cuddalore district, Tamil Nadu